Ahmed Mekky is an Egyptian actor.

Ahmed Mekky or Ahmed Mekki may also refer to:

 Ahmed Mekky (CEO) (born 1971), Egyptian businessman
 Ahmed Mekki (political) (born 1941), former minister of justice of Egypt
 Ahmed Hassan Mekky (born 1987), Egyptian footballer